Senator Sheridan may refer to:

John V. Sheridan (1879–1947), New York State Senate
Thomas I. Sheridan (1890s–1960s), New York State Senate
Upton Sheredine (1740–1800), Maryland State Senate